The National Union of Co-operative Insurance Society Employees (NUCISE) was a trade union in the United Kingdom.

The union split from the recently formed National Union of Distributive and Allied Workers in 1922.  It affiliated  with the Transport and General Workers' Union in 1933, merging in 1982.

See also

 List of trade unions
 Transport and General Workers' Union
 TGWU amalgamations

References

Defunct trade unions of the United Kingdom
Insurance industry trade unions
1922 establishments in the United Kingdom
Trade unions established in 1922
Trade unions disestablished in 1934
Transport and General Workers' Union amalgamations